Cochlospermum regium, also known as yellow cotton tree, is a flowering plant that has its origins in the Cerrado tropical savanna of South America (Bolivia, Brazil, Paraguay), but now it is also common in Southeast Asia.

Cochlospermum regium is a small tree. Its yellow and bright flowers have antioxidant properties. 
In Thailand it is the provincial flower of Nakhon Nayok, Sara Buri, Buri Ram, Suphan Buri and Uthai Thani Provinces.

See also
List of plants of Cerrado vegetation of Brazil

References

External links

TopTropicals Plant Catalog
"SUPANNIGAR" Ramkhamhaeng University's Tree

regium
Medicinal plants of South America
Flora of South America
Plants described in 1819